Diary is a 2009 Indian Telugu-language psychological thriller film directed by Machakanti Ramakrishna and starring Sivaji and Shraddha Das.

Cast 
Sivaji as Vamsi
Shraddha Das as Maya
Dr Sivaprasad as Kanchu Kanakayya alias KK 
Chinnikrishna as Vamsi's driver
Jeeva as Maya's molester
Sridhara Rao as Albert
Mousami Udeshi as Mona
Yandamuri as Sastry
Harsha Vardhan as Police officer

Production 
The film was promoted as a sequel to Mantra (2007) although it is not.

Soundtrack 
The music was composed by Mantra Anand.

Reception 
A critic from Idlebrain.com wrote that "Though there are a few chilling moments in the movie, logic-less climax and slack second half work against the movie". A critic from Filmibeat wrote that "director Machakanti Ramakrishna has chosen to bring out the film in a narrative way by recreating the situations visually. This kind of narration helped in running the story smoothly". A critic from Full Hyderabad wrote that "On the whole, Diary will suit you if you're utterly starved of jitters".

References